Robert Mitford (1612–1674) was an English politician who sat in the House of Commons in 1659.

Mitford was the son of Cuthbert Mitford, of Mitford, Northumberland. He was admitted at Sidney Sussex College, Cambridge in 1634. He may have been admitted at Gray's Inn on 26 March 1634.  In 1659, he was elected Member of Parliament for Morpeth in the Third Protectorate Parliament.

Mitford died at the age of about 62 and was buried at Mitford, Northumberland on 28 June 1674.

Mitford married Philadelphia Wharton, daughter of Humphrey Wharton of Gillingwood, North Riding of Yorkshire.

References

1612 births
1674 deaths
English MPs 1659
Alumni of Sidney Sussex College, Cambridge
Members of Gray's Inn
Robert